The Turner River is a river in the Pilbara region of Western Australia.

Overview
The riverbed is alluvial and highly braided.

The river has three tributaries; Turner River East, Turner River West and Red Creek. It also flows through two large permanent pools, Kunagunarinna Pool and Moorambine Pool.

The mouth of the river is a large estuarine area that is mostly unmodified. The estuary functions primarily as a result of tidal energy.

Much of the river catchment is used for cattle (grazing); excess nutrients cause some eutrophication in some pools upstream. Some mining also occurs within the catchment area.

In 1952 Lang Hancock flew his plane low through the gorges in the Turner River to escape bad weather when he noticed the red ochre coloration of the rocks and thought it could be a significant deposit of iron ore. He later returned to collect samples which he duly had tested and discovered he had found a huge deposit of high grade ore.

References

Rivers of the Pilbara region